The Hussaini Dalan is an Imambara that was originally built during the later half of the Mughal rule in the 17th century in Dhaka. It was built as the Imambara of the Shia Muslim community. Hussaini Dalan serves as the main Hussainiya of Dhaka, or venue for majlis or gatherings held during the month of Muharram, the tenth day religious gathering commemorates the martyrdom of Hussain, the grandson of the Islamic prophet Muhammad.

History 

According to Taylor (1839),
The principal Mahommedan places of worship are the Edgah and Hossainee Delaun, the latter is said to have been built by a person named Mir Murad, who held the Darogahship of the Nawarrah Mehals, and had charge of the public buildings in the time of Sultan Muhammad Azam.

It was built during the Subedari of Prince Shah Shuja (r. 1639–1647 and 1652–1660), son of Mughal emperor Shah Jahan. Although Shuja was a Sunni Muslim, he patronized Shia institutions too. According to tradition, “Mir Murad had a vision of Imam Hussain erecting a 'taziah khana' or house of mourning which led to the construction of Hussaini Dalan.

Raised on the foundations of a former small taziakhana, the building has undergone alterations. During the rule of the East India Company, it was repaired in 1807 and 1810. The original date of construction is still disputed, but Hussaini Dalan in its present form is attributed to Naib Nazim Nusrat Jung, who rebuilt the imambara in 1823. The present flat roof was rebuilt by Nawab of Dhaka Sir Khwaja Ahsanuallah Bahadur after the earthquake of 1897, and another verandah was added to the southern side..

Architecture 
The main building is situated in the middle of complex, built on an area of about 0.65 Bighas (9,380 sq. ft/ 88.05 sq. meters). In the south touching the building there is a “pond” having an area of 1.01 Bighas (14,544 sq. ft/ 1376.95 sq meters). This pond is the main attraction of this building which touches the walls of the building

Built on a raised platform, it is a long rectangular building with four simple, yet elegant, cabins at the corners. An attractively built arched gateway, to the north gives right of entry to the building, while a stonework water tank is located directly to the south of the building.

The exterior incorporates both Mughal and British architectural traditions. The south verandah, overlooking the deep-water tank, best illustrates western background, with four columns of Doric order supporting the verandah. Mughal characteristics are seen in the attached three-storeyed pavilion with arched windows and the row of kanjuras (decorative merlons) on the roof.

The main floor of the building is raised on a platform that has rooms containing graves. On the main floor, two large halls known as Shirni hall and Khutba hall are placed back to back to form the nucleus of the building complex. Subsidiary two-storied rooms are on either side of the halls, probably to accommodate a congregation of ladies. And there is a series of three rooms on the east and the west. The side rooms, with the exception of those in the northernmost side room, have galleries on the second storey.

Celebrations
Shia Muslims are a minority in Dhaka. During the first 10 days of Muharram, Hussaini Dalan becomes a centre of mourning and religious gathering in old Dhaka. Both the Sunni and the Shia followers join the mourning, usually ending in Ashura when a large procession parades through the streets, though mourning continues from 1st day of muharram to 10th of the Islamic month Safar.

Gallery

See also 
 Architecture of Bengal
 Shia Islam in Bangladesh
 Shia Islam in India

References

 Ahmed, N. (1984). Discover the monuments of Bangladesh. Dhaka: University Press Limited. (pp. 180–181).
 Sayed, H. M. (1980). Muslim Monuments of Bangladesh. Dhaka: Islamic Foundation,(p. 58).
 Asher, Catherine, B. (1984). Inventory of Key Monuments. Art and Archaeology Research Papers: The Islamic Heritage of Bengal. Paris: UNESCO.(p. 56).
 Shiraji, M. M. (2006). Hussaini Dalan 2006. (n.d) Retrieve from: www.hussainidalan.com.

External links 
 http://www.Hussainidalan.com/
 https://web.archive.org/web/20140617100240/http://www.hussainidalan.com/en/index.php/about-dalan
 https://web.archive.org/web/20140616015611/http://hussainidalan.com/bn/index.php/2013-09-02-17-51-12/%E0%A6%B9%E0%A7%8B%E0%A6%B8%E0%A7%87%E0%A6%87%E0%A6%A8%E0%A7%80_%E0%A6%A6%E0%A6%BE%E0%A6%B2%E0%A6%BE%E0%A6%A8 (In Bangla)

Old Dhaka
Mosques in Dhaka
Buildings and structures in Dhaka
Shia shrines
Islamic architecture
Hussainiya
Tourist attractions in Dhaka